Abigail "Nabby" Amelia Adams Smith (July 14, 1765 – August 15, 1813) was the daughter of Abigail and John Adams, founding father and second President of the United States, and the sister of John Quincy Adams, sixth President of the United States. She was named for her mother.

Romance and marriage 
At the age of 18, Adams met and fell in love with Royall Tyler. Her father thought she was too young to be courted, but he eventually accepted it. At one point the two were even engaged to be married. But John Adams, then the U.S. minister to the Kingdom of Great Britain, eagerly called for his wife and daughter to join him in London. For a time, Adams maintained a long-distance relationship with Tyler, but eventually broke off the engagement, leaving Tyler depressed.

Shortly afterward Adams met Colonel William Stephens Smith, who was serving as her father's secretary and was 10 years her senior. They would later be related by marriage—Col. Smith's sister was the wife of Adams's brother Charles. They were married at the American minister's residence in London on June 12, 1786. Adams's observations of European life and customs, and of many of the distinguished statesmen of the day, were later published.

Their courtship was thought to be too short by Adams's parents, and historians have not considered it to be a good marriage. While Colonel Smith was kind to his family, he never settled, continually seeking a better lot in life. He spent more money than he earned and lost everything to real estate speculation in the early 1800s. This left them on a small farm along the Chenango River in central New York.

Their children were:

Diagnosis of breast cancer 
In 1810, Smith was diagnosed with breast cancer. On October 8, 1811, a mastectomy was performed by John Warren and several assistants without any anesthesia in an upstairs room of the Adams home. Her mother, husband, and daughter Caroline were also on hand to assist.

The surgery 
The exact details of the surgery are not known but it was described as a typical 19th-century operation. The instruments used during the surgery consisted of a large fork with a pair of six-inch prongs sharpened to a needle point, a wooden-handled razor, a small oven filled with heated coals, and a thick iron spatula. Before the surgery began Dr. Warren strapped Smith into a chair to restrain her, and then began to remove the clothing to expose the area on which he would operate. Once the diseased breast was exposed, other physicians held her left arm back so that Warren would have better access to the diseased tissue. He began the surgery by thrusting the large fork into her breast and lifting it from the chest wall. He then sliced at the base of the breast until it was completely severed from her chest. After removing the breast, he saw that the cancer had spread to the lymph nodes under Smith's arms, and he worked to remove those tumors as well. To stop Smith's bleeding, Warren applied the heated spatula to cauterize the open cuts, and then sutured the wounds. The surgery took around 25 minutes, and dressing the wounds took more than an hour. Warren and his assistants later expressed astonishment that Smith endured the pain of the surgery and cauterization without crying out, despite the gruesomeness of the operation, which was so horrifying it caused her mother, husband, and daughter to turn away.

Death 
In 1812, Smith finally started to feel well and returned to the family farm in New York. In early 1813, she began feeling pain in her abdomen and spine, as well as suffering from painful headaches. At first a local doctor in New York said that the pain was from rheumatism, but later that year new tumors began to appear in the scar tissue as well as on her skin. She then returned to Quincy, telling her husband that she preferred to die at her parents' home. She died in August 1813 at the age of 48. She was buried at Hancock Cemetery in Quincy.

Depictions in popular culture 

Smith's death is a poignant part of the 2008 John Adams miniseries, in which she is played by Sarah Polley; Smith as a young girl was played by Madeline Taylor in the first three episodes of the same series. The series took artistic license by shifting Smith's cancer diagnosis to 1803, and changing many other aspects of her life.

Mount Vernon Hotel Museum and Garden 
The Abigail Adams Smith Museum, now known as the Mount Vernon Hotel Museum and Garden, was a carriage house built in 1799 by a wealthy New York china merchant on property purchased from Smith and her husband. The carriage house was purchased by Joseph Hart and converted into a day hotel. Day hotels were popular at the time as they provided the burgeoning New York middle class an escape from the overcrowded and oppressive city.  It was called the Mount Vernon Hotel after George Washington's home in Virginia and functioned in this capacity from 1826 to 1833.  The property changed hands again when it was purchased by Jeremiah Towle.  It served as the Towle family's private residence until 1905 when, with the spread of industrialization, it was purchased by Standard Gas Light Company.  The building was preserved until its ultimate purchase by the Colonial Dames of America in 1924.  In 1939, the building was opened to the public as the Abigail Adams Smith Museum. The Colonial Dames of America reinterpreted the house as a day hotel and reopened it as the Mount Vernon Hotel Museum and Garden in 2000.  It remains open to the public with museum tours daily (except Monday).

Family tree

Notes

References

External links 
Nagel, Paul. The Adams Women: Abigail and Louisa Adams, Their Sisters and Daughters. Cambridge:  Harvard University Press, 1999.
The Adams Children
American Experience-John And Abigail Adams
Adams family biographies – Massachusetts Historical Society
Olson, James. Essays about Abigail "Nabby" Adams from book, Bathsheba's Breast: Women, Cancer & History. Johns Hopkins University Press, 2005.

1765 births
1813 deaths
Colonial American women
Deaths from breast cancer
Children of presidents of the United States
Children of vice presidents of the United States
Adams political family
Quincy family
People from Quincy, Massachusetts
Deaths from cancer in Massachusetts
Burials in Massachusetts
People of colonial Massachusetts
18th-century American women
19th-century American women
Children of John Adams